Euthales may refer to:

 An algae genus, now a synonym of Velleia
 A noctuid moth genus, now a synonym of Cryphia